Emuna Elon (Hebrew: אמונה אלון) (born 1955) is an Israeli author, journalist, and women's rights activist.

Biography 
Emuna Elon was born in 1955 in Jerusalem, the daughter of rabbi and professor Pinchas Hacohen Peli and his wife Pnina. She was raised in Jerusalem and New York, lived for many years in the Israeli settlement of Beit El, and currently lives in Jerusalem. She was married to the late Rabbi Binyamin Elon, a former Knesset member, and is the mother of six children. The name Emuna means faith.

From 1991 to 2005, she wrote a column in Yedioth Ahronoth, Israel's largest newspaper, where she advocated the separation of Judaism and politics.

She has written novels for adults and children, as well as non-fiction books. Some of her novels have been translated into English. "If You Awaken Love", was her first novel translated into English. It was a finalist for the 2007 National Jewish Book Award).

Selected books 
Leftsock, 2007 (children's novel)
If You Awaken Love, London/New Milford, AmazonCrossing, 2007
 Beyond My Sight, Kinneret, Zmora-Bitan, 2012
 Only When I Close My Eyes, Kinneret, Zmora-Bitan, 2015
 House on Many Waters, Kinneret, Zmora-Bitan, 2016
Sonja's Zoom, Amsterdam/Antwerpen, Uitgeverij Atlas Contact, 2018

References

External links 
The Institute for the Translation of Hebrew Literature: Biography of Emuna Elon
Inscribe review of Emuna Elon's novel

1955 births
Living people
Israeli journalists
Israeli settlers
Israeli women journalists
Israeli novelists
Israeli Orthodox Jews
Israeli children's writers
Emuna
People from Jerusalem
Israeli women children's writers
Israeli women novelists